WDGA-CD, virtual channel 43 (UHF digital channel 30), is a low-powered, Class A Heartland-affiliated television station licensed to Dalton, Georgia, United States and primarily serving Chattanooga, Tennessee, and its northwest Georgia suburbs. The station is owned by North Georgia Television, which also owns WDNN-CD (channel 49), also licensed in Dalton.

History
WDGA-CD was affiliated with the Spanish-language Azteca America network until December 1, 2012 when it became an affiliate of Heartland, just a month after the network relaunched after almost a ten-year absence.

Programming
Some Heartland programs are pre-empted in favor of locally produced public affairs programming in certain timeslots.

Digital television

Digital channels
The station's digital signal is multiplexed:

Spectrum auction results
WDGA-CD was expected to move its allocation to UHF digital channel 30 due to its participation of the FCC Spectrum auction of 2016-17. The station was licensed to operate on channel 30 on January 24, 2020.

References

External links

Station website

DGA-CD
Television channels and stations established in 1988
Antenna TV affiliates